Snap parliamentary elections were held in Ukraine on 26 October 2014 to elect members of the Verkhovna Rada. President Petro Poroshenko had pressed for early parliamentary elections since his victory in the presidential elections in May. The July breakup of the ruling coalition gave him the right to dissolve the parliament, so on 25 August 2014 he announced the early election.

Voting did not take place in the Russian-occupied Autonomous Republic of Crimea and Sevastopol, nor in large parts of Donetsk and Luhansk oblasts because of the ongoing war in Donbas. Because of this, 27 of the 450 seats remained unfilled.

The elections were seen as a realignment. Ruling from 2010 to 2014, and taking one of the top two spots in elections since 2006, the Party of Regions did not participate in the 2014 elections, while its informal successor Opposition Bloc received only 9% of the vote. For the first time since Ukrainian independence, the Communist Party of Ukraine failed to win a seat. Four newly created parties received the highest vote shares; the Petro Poroshenko Bloc (formed in July 2014 by Poroshenko's supporters), People's Front (split from Fatherland in August 2014), Self Reliance (registered in 2012) and Opposition Bloc (formed in September 2014 by a group of the former Party of Regions members).

The work of the new parliament started on 27 November 2014. On the same day, five factions formed the "European Ukraine" coalition: Petro Poroshenko Bloc, People's Front, Self Reliance, Radical Party and Fatherland. On 2 December the second Yatsenyuk government was approved.

Background
According to the election law of November 2011, elections to the Verkhovna Rada must take place at least every five years. That law came into effect with the 2012 Ukrainian parliamentary election. If the Rada had sat for the maximum allotted time, the next parliamentary election would have occurred on 29 October 2017. Despite this, the president-elect Petro Poroshenko said that he wanted to hold early parliamentary elections following his victory in the presidential election on 25 May 2014. At 26 June session of the Parliamentary Assembly of the Council of Europe, Poroshenko said that he hoped to hold parliamentary elections in October 2014, portraying this as "the most democratic way".

The parliamentary coalition that supported the Yatsenyuk Government, formed in the aftermath of the 2014 Ukrainian revolution and of the Euromaidan movement, was dissolved on 24 July. If no new coalition formed within thirty days, President Poroshenko would become entitled to dissolve the Rada and to call early parliamentary elections. On the same day as the dissolution, the Sovereign European Ukraine faction submitted a bill to the Rada that called for elections to take place on 28 September 2014.

In an interview with Ukrainian television channels on 14 August, Poroshenko justified early elections because the Rada refused to recognise the self-proclaimed breakaway Donetsk and Lugansk People's Republics as terrorist organisations. The two republics, situated in the eastern Ukrainian region of the Donbas, originated in the Donetsk and Luhansk oblasts of Ukraine respectively, and have been fighting Ukrainian government forces in the war in Donbas. President Poroshenko said: "I don't know how to work with a parliament in which a huge number [of deputies], whole factions, make up 'the fifth column' controlled from abroad [referring to Russia]. And this danger is only increasing". He also said that new elections "are the best and the most efficient form of lustration of not only the parliament but also the political forces".

Poroshenko announced on 25 August that he had called for elections to the Rada to take place on 26 October 2014. In his accompanying television address, he portrayed the elections as necessary to "purify the Rada of the mainstay of [former president] Viktor Yanukovych". These deputies, Poroshenko said, "clearly do not represent the people who elected them". Poroshenko also painted these Rada deputies as responsible for "the [January 2014] Dictatorship laws that took the lives of the Heavenly Hundred". Poroshenko also stated that many of the (then) current MPs were "direct sponsors and accomplices or at least sympathizers of the militants/separatists".

Electoral system
The Verkhovna Rada has 450 members, elected to a five-year term in parallel voting, with 225 members elected in single-member constituencies using FPTP system and 225 members elected by proportional representation (closed list) in a single nationwide constituency using the largest remainder method with 5% threshold. Parties are not allowed to form electoral blocs (in contrast to 1998-2007 elections). Attempts to return to proportional representation with open party lists and electoral blocs were failed.

The division into 225 electoral districts was the same as at the 2012 election. The voting was organized only in 198 of them.

Non-voting areas
The voting was impossible to provide on the territories that was not under government control. Particularly, because of Russian occupation of Crimea there was no voting in all 10 districts in Autonomous Republic of Crimea and 2 in Sevastopol. The voting in Donbas was provided partially. The democratic watchdog OPORA estimated that 4.6 million Ukrainians were unable to vote: 1.8 million in Crimea and the city of Sevastopol, 1.6 million in Donetsk Oblast and 1.2 million in Luhansk Oblast.

Crimea
About 1.8 million of eligible voters live in Autonomous Republic of Crimea and the city of Sevastopol, that is 5% of the whole number of voters in Ukraine. Ukrainian government lost control over the region in March 2014 during the Crimean crisis. Since that time no legitimate elections are provided there. In the 2014 legislative election Crimean voters had ability to vote in any other region for party-lists in the single nationwide constituency, but they were unable to vote for candidates in single-member constituencies.

Donbas
"Donbas" is an unofficial name of 2 the most eastern Ukrainian oblasts: Donetsk and Luhansk. About 5 million of eligible voters live there, that is 14% of the whole number of voters in Ukraine. After an active phase of war in Donbas in the summer 2014 and September ceasefire, roughly a half of the region remained to be controlled by separatists loyal to Yanukovych. On the day before the election, the CEC stated that there was no ability to provide voting in the captured areas. Thus, full-fledged voting was provided only in 8 districts of 32. Other 9 districts were split by the front line for controlled and not controlled areas, so voting was provided there only partly. In 2 of them only slight number of polling station was opened: in 53rd district only 9% of voters were able to vote and in 45th district only 2%. In spite of this, the elections in these single-member constituencies were recognized as successful, and the winners (Oleh Nedava and Yukhym Zvyahilsky) got mandates. To the other 15 districts ballots were not transferred at all.

Instead of this election, on the captured territories separatists organized so-called "Donbas general elections" on 2 November, that were a violation of Minsk agreement and were not recognized by the world community.

Campaign
In the 225 electoral districts some 3,321 candidates participated, out of which 2,018 were independent candidates. 52 political parties nominated candidates. 147 candidates withdrew after the 1 October candidate registration deadline.

In the election campaign the parties positions on foreign relations and the war in Donbas could be roughly divided into two groups. The first group consisted of pro-European parties that advocated to end the war in Donbas by use of force and consisted of Fatherland Party, Civic Position, Radical Party and People's Front (this party was ambiguous about use of force). Svoboda also wanted to end the war in Donbas by use of force. The party Petro Poroshenko Bloc was the only pro-European party that wanted to end the war in Donbas by a peaceful solution. The second group was Strong Ukraine and Opposition Bloc who were considered pro-Russian and they advocated to end the war in Donbas by a peaceful solution. The Communist Party of Ukraine (according to political scientist Tadeusz A. Olszański) "effectively supports the separatist rebellion".

According to Olszański Radical Party and the Communists were the only left-wing parties.

Registered parties and candidates

Nationwide party lists
On 26 September 2014 the Central Election Commission of Ukraine finished registering the nationwide party lists. A total of 29 parties participated in the election. Parties appeared on the ballot in the following order:

 Radical Party of Oleh Lyashko
 Solidarity of Ukrainian Women
 Internet Party of Ukraine
 Opposition Bloc
 People's Front
 5.10
 All-Ukrainian Agrarian Union "ZASTUP"
 Revival
 New Politics
 United Country
 People's Power
 Svoboda
 National Democratic Party of Ukraine
 Communist Party of Ukraine
 Self Reliance Party
 Ukraine is United
 Right Sector
 Ukraine of the Future
 Liberal Party of Ukraine
 Party of Greens of Ukraine
 Green Planet
 Petro Poroshenko Bloc
 Strength and Honour
 Congress of Ukrainian Nationalists
 Strong Ukraine
 Fatherland
 Civil Position
 Bloc of Ukrainian Left Forces
 Ukrainian Civil Movement

Forming of political coalitions
On 2 September Vitaliy Kovalchuk (the parliamentary leader) of UDAR stated that since his party and Petro Poroshenko Bloc had agreed to "joint participation in parliamentary elections" on 29 March 2014 the two parties were "in discussion" about "the format" for how to do so in these elections. On 15 September it became clear that 30% of the Petro Poroshenko Bloc election list would be filled by members of UDAR and that UDAR leader Vitali Klitschko is at the top of this list, Klitschko vowed not to resign as incumbent Mayor of Kyiv.

7 September party congress of Civil Position decided that the party would participate in the election on a partly list with members of Democratic Alliance.

On 10 September, the Fatherland Party split because party leaders Yatsenyuk and Turchynov became founding members of the new party People's Front.

The biggest party in the previous 2012 parliamentary elections, Party of Regions, chose not to participate in the election because of a perceived lack of legitimacy (of the election), because not every resident of the Donbas could vote. Individual members of the Party of Regions would take part in the election as candidates of the party Opposition Bloc. According to Yuriy Boyko, who is heading the party's election list, Opposition Bloc does not represent parties, but consists only of individual politicians.

Opinion polls

Conduct
The elections were monitored by 2,321 accredited foreign observers, 304 of them on behalf of 21 states and 2,017 from 20 international organisations.

The Ukrainian democratic watchdog OPORA stated about the elections that they were legitimate, but that "the [election] campaign cannot be called fully free within the limits of the country" because of the fighting in the Donbas region. The NGO Committee of Voters of Ukraine asked the Central Election Commission of Ukraine to declare invalid the results of constituencies 45 and 102 because there "significant irregularities were numerous".

The OSCE stated about the elections that they were "in line with international commitments, and were characterized by many positive aspects, including an impartial and efficient Central Election Commission, competitive contests that offered voters real choice, and general respect for fundamental freedoms". European Council President Herman Van Rompuy and European Commission President José Manuel Barroso called the elections "a victory of the people of Ukraine and of democracy". US President Barack Obama and his Secretary of State John Kerry also congratulated Ukraine "on successful parliamentary elections". The day after the election Russian Foreign Minister Sergey Lavrov stated "I think we will recognize this election because it is very important for us that Ukraine will finally have authorities that do not fight one another, do not drag Ukraine to the West or to the East, but that will deal with the real problems facing the country". He also hoped that the new Ukrainian government "will be constructive, will not seek to continue escalating confrontational tendencies in society, (in ties) with Russia". Lavrov's Deputy Foreign Minister Grigory Karasin stated "the election is valid in spite of the rather harsh and dirty election campaign". Karasin also "welcomed the success of parties supporting a peaceful resolution of the conflict in eastern Ukraine" and warned that "nationalistic and chauvinistic forces" in parliament could undermine peace efforts and were "extremely dangerous". Senator Vladimir Dzhabarov, acting chairman of the (Russian) Federation Council's International Affairs Committee, stated that "The contacts earlier established between the State Duma and the Federation Council on the one hand and the Verkhovna Rada on the other will hopefully be re-launched in some format" although he stated he could not imagine how these contacts would be developed since he believed "The new Ukrainian parliament has become more radical-minded". Dzhabarov claimed about the elections that "If such elections had been held in some other country, in Russia for instance, the West would have never recognized them as legitimate. Nevertheless, the West and Europe have recognized the Ukrainian elections as valid". Observers of the Organization of the Black Sea Economic Cooperation were positive about the elections and in particular welcomed that "administrative resources" were not used in the elections. Observers of the International Republican Institute also expressed this opinion and stated that its observers had witnessed only minor non-systemic irregularities that could not have affected the outcome of the election.

Results
The counting of votes was significantly delayed: Central Electoral Commission announced that all ballots were counted on 10 November only. The announcement of the result for 38th electoral district was delayed until mid-November due to the results being challenged in court.

Voter turnout was much reduced from 2012 (16,052,228 down from 20,797,206). The main reason of this decrease was the impossibility to organize voting in some regions. Because of this,  the official turnout was calculated by division by the number of people who live in areas where voting was provided only (according to the CEC, it was 30,921,218). So, the official voter turnout was 51.91%. In any case this percent is smaller than in 2012, when the turnout was 57.43%.

The turnout level had obvious geographical differences. The highest turnout (60-70%) was registered in western regions (except Zakarpattia and Chernivtsi Oblast), the level of turnout in central regions was average (54-58%) and in southern and eastern regions it was quite low (40-48%). The turnout in two oblasts of Donbas (or more exactly in the parts of these oblasts where the voting was provided) was 32% - the lowest in the country.

Previously, the Donbas region displayed high turnout for every election. According to Tadeusz Olszański of Centre for Eastern Studies, The Party of Regions that had plenitude of the power over this region until the 2014 Ukrainian revolution artificially increased voter turnout there. The 2014 election was the end of this artificial increase. One more reason of low turnout in Donbas as well as in other south-eastern regions was a feeling among a significant part of the local population that no party represented their interests.

By single-member constituency

Government formation

By-elections

2015
On 26 July 2015 mid-term election were held in constituency 205 located in Chernihiv. These were necessary after 2014 winner Valeriy Kulich had left parliament because of his appointment as Governor of Chernihiv Oblast. 91 candidates took part in the elections; eight of them for political parties, the others were self-nominated candidates. On election day the ballot paper stretched to about 1 meter. 36 candidates had withdrawn from participation in the elections. During the election campaign top candidates Hennadiy Korban and Serhiy Berezenko were repeatedly accused of bribing voters, the use of black PR and other violations (of the electoral legislation).

The election was won by Berezenko of Petro Poroshenko Bloc with 35.90% of the vote. Second most votes were won by Korban of UKROP who received 14.76%. The official voter turnout was set at 35.3%.

2016
On 17 July 2016 mid-term election were held in 7 single-member districts (constituency 23, 27, 85, 114, 151, 183 and 206) because their representatives had been elected to executive political positions and the death of Ihor Yeremeyev. Turnout varied from about 50% until less than 20%. The elections were monitored by 57 international official observers.

Vote counting in constituency 114 (situated in Stanytsia Luhanska) was disrupted after several members of the election commission refused to count votes. In the same constituency 14 criminal cases for violating the election were opened. Constituency 151 was last in announcing its final results when it did so on 21 July 2016.

Notes

References

External links

Homepage Central Election Commission of Ukraine 
Interactive map with election results by OPORA  

Parliamentary elections in Ukraine
Ukraine
Parliamentary
8th Ukrainian Verkhovna Rada
Parliamentary